Salcedillo is a municipality located in the Cuencas Mineras comarca, province of Teruel, Aragon, Spain. According to the 2010 census the municipality has a population of 8 inhabitants. Its postal code is 44793.

Salcedillo is located in the Sierra de Cucalón area.

See also
 Cuencas Mineras
List of municipalities in Teruel

References

External links 

Municipalities in the Province of Teruel